Russia competed at the inaugural 7 sports 2018 European Championships held in Berlin, Germany, and Glasgow, United Kingdom from 2 to 12 August 2018. It competed in 5 sports with no athletes in the Athletics and Golf events.

The Aquatics Championships became the country's most successful in the history of the championships in regard to the medal count. The previous record was broken on 9 August 2018, when until then the Russians collected 39 medals, 19 of which were gold medals, 12 silver medals and 8 bronze medals.

Russia topped the medal table at the end of the championships on 12 August 2018 with 31 gold medals and received the European Championships Trophy.

Medallists

|  style="text-align:left; width:70%; vertical-align:top;"|

* Participated in the heats only and received medals.
|  style="text-align:left; width:22%; vertical-align:top;"|

Aquatics

Diving
A total of 12 divers (6 men and 6 women) represented Russia in the diving events.

Men

Women

Mixed

Open water swimming
A total of 11 swimmers (6 men and 5 women) represented Russia in the open water swimming events.

Men

Women

Mixed

Swimming
A total of 41 swimmers (25 men and 16 women) represented Russia in the swimming events.

Men

Legend: Q = Semifinalist qualified for the final as the race winner or runner up; q = Qualified for the next round as fastest times (heats) or as a fastest losers (semifinals); SO = Same time as opponent(s), qualification decided via swim-off; N/A = Round not applicable for the event; * = Participated in the heats only (eligible for medals)

Women

Legend: Q = Semifinalist qualified for the final as the race winner or runner up; q = Qualified for the next round as fastest times (heats) or as a fastest losers (semifinals); SO = Same time as opponent(s), qualification decided via swim-off; N/A = Round not applicable for the event; * = Participated in the heats only (eligible for medals)

Mixed events

Legend: q = Qualified for the next round as fastest times; SO = Same time as opponent(s), qualification decided via swim-off; * = Participated in the heats only (eligible for medals)

Synchronized swimming
A total of 13 swimmers (1 men and 12 women) represented Russia in the synchronized swimming events.

Athletics

At the time in which the championships took place, Russia was suspended by the International Association of Athletics Federations (IAAF) from competing in international events. Russian athletes cleared by the IAAF to compete entered the championships as Authorised Neutral Athletes.

Cycling

BMX
A total of 6 riders (3 men and 3 women) represented Russia in the BMX events.

Mountain biking
A total of 5 riders (3 men and 2 women) represented Russia in the mountain bike events.

Road
A total of 10 riders (6 men and 4 women) represented Russia in the road events.

Men

Women

Track
A total of 22 riders (14 men and 8 women) represented Russia in the track events.

Individual sprint

Team sprint

Pursuit

Time trial

Keirin

Omnium

Madison

Points

Scratch

Elimination

Golf

Russia did not have any golfers in the events.

Gymnastics

A total of 10 athletes (5 men and 5 women) represented Russia in the artistic gymnastics events.

Men
Team

Individual

Women
Team

 
Individual

Rowing

A total of 32 rowers (23 men and 9 women) represented Russia in the rowing events.

Men

Qualification Legend: FA=Final A (medal); FB=Final B (non-medal); FC=Final C (non-medal); FD=Final D (non-medal); FE=Final E (non-medal); FF=Final F (non-medal); SA/B=Semifinals A/B; SC/D=Semifinals C/D; SE/F=Semifinals E/F; QF=Quarterfinals; R=Repechage

Women

Qualification Legend: FA=Final A (medal); FB=Final B (non-medal); FC=Final C (non-medal); FD=Final D (non-medal); FE=Final E (non-medal); FF=Final F (non-medal); SA/B=Semifinals A/B; SC/D=Semifinals C/D; SE/F=Semifinals E/F; QF=Quarterfinals; R=Repechage

Triathlon

A total of 10 athletes (5 men and 5 women) represented Russia in the triathlon events.

References

External links
 European Championships official site

2018
Nations at the 2018 European Championships
2018 in Russian sport